A vacuum fryer is a deep-frying device housed inside a vacuum chamber.

Vacuum fryers are fit to process low-quality potatoes that contain higher sugar levels than normal, as they frequently have to be processed in spring and early summer before the potatoes from the new harvest become available. With vacuum frying it is easier to maintain natural colors and flavours of the finished product. The fat absorption of the products is also reported to be lower than in atmospheric fryers. In South East Asia (mainly Philippines, Thailand, China and Indonesia) batch type vacuum fryers are mainly used for the production of fruit chips. However, these machines are only appropriate for relatively small production companies.

Working principle
Vacuum fryer works on the principle of simple physics that as the pressure decreases below atmospheric pressure the boiling point of the water also reduces below 100 degree Celsius. All vacuum fryer are designed to achieve these goal so that heat sensitive foods can be fried at lower than 100 degree celsius which would otherwise have burned in normal deep frying process.

Continuous vacuum fryers
For larger production quantities, continuous vacuum fryers are available. In these installations, the vacuum frying pan is installed in a stainless steel vacuum tube. The infeed of the raw product is carried out through a rotary airlock.
Depending on the application, the frying pan itself is designed to meet the different product specifications. A transport belt takes the finished product out of the fryer and towards the outfeed system. A lock chamber at the exit of the vacuum tube prevents air from entering the vacuum zone, and a belt system takes the product from one zone to another.

The vacuum is created by vacuum pumps, and the whole system is controlled by a programmable logic controller.

In batch fryers, the frying oil has to be replaced quite often as it is sensitive to temperature changes. Continuous vacuum fryers lead to a longer lifetime of the frying oil and therefore lower the production costs. Vacuum fryers can also reduce oil content in fried foods. The amount of reduced oil content, usually 1–3%, depends on the type of vacuum fryer.

See also

 List of cooking appliances
 List of deep fried foods

References

External links

Further reading
 

Food industry
Food technology
Cooking appliances